GABA transferase may refer to:
 4-aminobutyrate transaminase, an enzyme
 4-aminobutyrate—pyruvate transaminase, an enzyme